The BMW X is a small five-cylinder radial engine for sport and training aircraft. Although this engine proved successful at several large-scale events in 1930, including that year's round-Europe flight, only a few were built.

The Xa was also not built in any quantity and was mainly installed in training and sport aircraft.

Variants
XBore:, Stroke:
XaBore:, Stroke:

Applications
 BFW M.23
 BFW M.31
 Gerner G.IIR
 Klemm L25

Specifications (BMW Xa)

See also

References

Further reading

External links

BMW X on the test rig
Klemm L 25 sports aircraft with BMW X or BMW Xa engine
BMW X
Klemm L 25 sports aircraft with BMW X or BMW Xa aeroengine
Klemm L 25 sports aircraft with BMW X or BMW Xa aeroengine
Klemm L 25 sports aircraft with BMW X or BMW Xa engine
Klemm L 25 sports aircraft with BMW X or BMW Xa engine
Klemm L 25 sports aircraft with BMW X or BMW Xa engine
BMW X

X
1920s aircraft piston engines